The Fergana Oblast was an oblast (province) of the Russian Empire. It roughly corresponded to most of present-day Fergana Valley. It was created in 1876 when the territories of the former Khanate of Kokand were annexed to Russia (except for the oblasts of Syr-Darya Oblast and Semirechye Oblast, which were part of the khanate before Russian conquest between 1853 and 1865). Its administrative center was the city of Kokand.

The Oblast was disbanded after the Russian Revolution and on April 30, 1918 the region became a part of the Turkestan ASSR.

Administrative division 
As of 1897, the Fergana Oblast was divided into 5 uyezds:

Demographics
As of 1897, 1,572,214 people populated the oblast. Turkic speaking Sarts (Today called Uzbeks) constituted the majority of the population. Significant minorities consisted of Kyrgyz and Tajiks. Total Turkic speaking were 1.439,989 (91,6% of the total population of the oblast).

Ethnic groups in 1897

References

 
Oblasts of the Russian Empire
Central Asia in the Russian Empire